Pachi y Pablo was a Chilean musical duo, famous in Chile during the 1970s.

Sonia Paz Soto-Aguilar Orellana and Pablo Rosetti, both students at Universidad de Chile, recorded two hit songs: "Que Maravilla" ("How Marvelous") and "Y te dire que hay amor" ("I tell you, Love is here"). 
Both songs were in first and second place in the Chilean Musical Billboard charts for 16 weeks in 1972.

They appeared on many magazine covers, and did many television programs. 
The first one was The Show of Alexander on Canal 7.
Then Sabados Gigantes on Canal 13 Catholic University. 
And several other programs on Canal 9 University of Chile.

They toured Chile, where the public was so taken by them, that it was necessary the assistance of the local police to keep the duo safe from their fans.

The duo separated in 1973.  
Pachi went to Rutgers University in New Jersey, made a family and a happy life in California.       
Pablo went to sing and made a happy life in El Salvador.

Pachi was presented with a Gold Record from the Asfona Recording Label in 2007 during a 10-day reality show based on her life by Mega Television Chile.

Pablo died on May 26, 2019, due to a long disease.

External links
Pachi y Pablo on Myspace

References

Chilean pop music groups
Chilean musical duos